The Horner–Hyde House is a historic house located at 100 W. Capitol Ave. in Pierre, South Dakota. Henry Horner started building the house in 1889 and continued adding to it until 1913. The Queen Anne house features shingle siding in its gables, a cross gabled roof, and a bay window on its east side. While living in the house, Horner was a prominent attorney and real estate dealer who served two terms in the South Dakota Senate. After Horner died in 1930, Charles Lee Hyde bought the house. Hyde came from a family of wealthy real estate developers; in addition to managing the family's land, Hyde served in the South Dakota Senate and House of Representatives and helped lead local youth groups.

The house was added to the National Register of Historic Places on December 20, 1988.

References

Houses on the National Register of Historic Places in South Dakota
Queen Anne architecture in South Dakota
Houses completed in 1889
Houses in Pierre, South Dakota
National Register of Historic Places in Pierre, South Dakota